Yung Krall (born 1946) is an American former spy born in Vietnam.  Her autobiography, A Thousand Tears Falling, recounts her life growing up in the midst of the Vietnam War, as well as her life in America as a spy for the CIA, FBI, and NSA.

She is the mother of actor and comedian Lance Krall.

Biography
Yung Krall was born Đặng Mỹ Dung in 1946 near Cần Thơ in Vietnam during the French administration of the Indochine colony, and lived there during the 
Anti-French Resistance War. She was nine years old at the signing of the Geneva Conference, which divided Vietnam into North and South Vietnam. Yung's mother chose to remain in South Vietnam to raise her children while her husband joined the Communist cause in the North with the NLF, eventually becoming Hanoi's ambassador to the U.S.S.R. Krall's father remained in the North for the greater part of her upbringing.

Krall gained employment working for American vendors on a U.S. Navy base near Saigon where she met Lt. John Krall, a U.S. Navy pilot, whom she later married. The two of them moved to the United States.

Using her background as a native Vietnamese, she worked with the CIA and FBI to bring down a communist Vietnamese subgroup and recruit members in the U.S. and Europe. She played a role in the capture and conviction of North Vietnamese spies Ronald Humphrey and David Truong.

References

External links

American memoirists
Living people
Vietnamese emigrants to the United States
1946 births